The Antelope Valley Line is a commuter rail line that serves the Northern Los Angeles County area as part of the Metrolink system. The northern segment of the line is rural in character because it travels through the sparsely populated Soledad Canyon between Santa Clarita and Palmdale, serving the small community of Acton along the way.  Other portions of its route parallel the former US Route 6, now San Fernando Road and Sierra Highway and this line is the only Metrolink line to be entirely in Los Angeles County.

History
The line along the Santa Clara River and into Los Angeles was completed by Southern Pacific in 1876 as the first railway to connect the city to the national network. The last passenger trains operated over the line in 1971 followed by the final freight train in 1979.

In 1990 the Los Angeles County Transportation Commission, predecessor of Los Angeles County Metropolitan Transportation Authority, purchased the right of way from Southern Pacific. Control of the line was then transferred to the newly-formed Southern California Regional Rail Authority who prepared the route for commuter rail service. Passenger operations began on October 26, 1992 and was called the Santa Clarita Line at the time. It was one of three original lines in the Metrolink system along with Ventura County and San Bernardino lines. The route initially ran from Los Angeles Union Station in Downtown Los Angeles to the Santa Clarita station making stops only at Glendale and Downtown Burbank stations.

Earthquake traffic relief
Since the beginning of service, Metrolink had plans to extend the line north to the Antelope Valley but these plans were expedited by almost 10 years following the 1994 Northridge earthquake. The earthquake caused the collapse of the freeway connector of State Route 14 (the Antelope Valley Freeway) onto Interstate 5 (the Golden State Freeway) at the Newhall Pass interchange, forcing all traffic to use the parallel 2 lane truck bypass that was unaffected by the quake.  With funding from the Federal Emergency Management Agency the Southern California Regional Rail Authority constructed an emergency extension of the line to Lancaster to help relieve the traffic bottleneck. The U.S. Navy Seabees construction battalion and crews from the L.A. County Public Works Department were able to construct the stations in just a few days, compared to the normal three to six months. Emergency stations in Lancaster and Palmdale were both built in just three days and Metrolink started operating trains one week after the earthquake struck. Over the next five weeks additional emergency stations were added in Sylmar/San Fernando, Vincent Grade/Acton and Santa Clarita (Via Princessa). While most of the emergency stations have since been replaced with permanent stations, the Via Princessa station still uses the same platform built after the earthquake.

Service expansion
Saturday service on the Antelope Valley Line has been operating since 1999, Sunday service was added in September 2007. As of August 2013, weekend service has expanded to 6 trains on Saturdays and Sundays. Arrivals at LA Union Station are timed to allow passengers to connect with Amtrak trains and trains on Metrolink's Orange County and San Bernardino lines.

Express service was added to the line in May 2011. Two express trains operate in the peak commute direction between Palmdale and Los Angeles (one southbound train in the morning, one northbound train in the evening). Express trains are about 18 minutes faster than trains that stop at all stations.

On April 30, 2015, Metrolink announced it will be offering discounted fares to riders on the Antelope Valley Line beginning July 1, 2015 as part of a pilot program. The fare pilot program, which will be in place for six months following the program's launch, will include several new ticket pricing options for riders on the Antelope Valley Line. There will be a 25 percent reduction in fares on all ticket types for trips along the corridor from Los Angeles to Lancaster, with the exception of the Weekend Day Pass, which will remain at its current $10 fare. In addition, a new "station-to-station" fare will be introduced in which riders traveling during off-peak hours (9 a.m. to 2 p.m.) will be able to purchase a one-way ticket to travel between stations for $2 per station. This fare is designed to encourage local trips using Metrolink as an additional mobility option complementing local bus service.

A new Burbank Airport–North station opened in 2018 to serve Antelope Valley Line passengers traveling to Hollywood Burbank Airport. The station is located near the intersection of San Fernando Boulevard and Hollywood Way, with a free shuttle bus for passengers to the airport terminal located approximately one mile away from the station site.  Metrolink tickets holders may also make a free Metro bus connection with Metrolink ticket.

In July 2019, additional late evening train service and bi-directional service were being considered.

Pacoima plane crash
On January 9, 2022, a private Cessna 172 crashed onto the tracks of the Antelope Valley Line at Osborne Street in Pacoima after taking off from nearby Whiteman Airport and was then struck by a Metrolink train. The Cessna's pilot was injured in the initial crash, but Los Angeles Police Department officers on the scene were able to help him out of the wreckage before it was hit by the train. No one aboard the train was injured.

Service

The Antelope Valley Line has 19 trains each way between Union Station and Lancaster on weekdays and six trains each way on weekends. As a commuter rail service, most weekday trains on the Antelope Valley line run during the peak morning and evening hours with the majority of trains operating southbound toward Los Angeles in the morning and northbound away from Los Angeles in the evening. There is limited mid-day and reverse commute service (northbound in the morning and southbound in the evening). Weekend service is more evenly spaced throughout the day.

As of the June 2016 timetable, only eight trains operate the full route from Lancaster to Los Angeles on weekdays and nine trains operate the full route from Los Angeles to Lancaster. Four southbound trains on weekdays originate in Palmdale and end in Newhall. The next available train with service to Los Angeles arrives in Newhall within 45 minutes. Most of the short turn trains have connecting North County TRANSporter bus service that takes passengers to or from the Palmdale station. All weekend trains operate the full route.

Two trains on weekdays operate on an express schedule in the peak commute direction (one train southbound in the morning and one train northbound in the evening) between Palmdale and Los Angeles making stops only at the Santa Clarita, Sylmar/San Fernando and Downtown Burbank stations.

Stations

Future
Metrolink was awarded $107 million in 2020 Intercity Rail Capital Program funds to begin a suite of upgrades to the line that would allow increasing frequencies to half-hourly between Santa Clarita and hourly to Lancaster. The improvements could add two infill stations between Burbank and Union Station, but staff recommend against utilizing multiple units. Metro announced in October 2020 that an environmental impact report is being prepared for a project which would add new double track between the Sylmar/San Fernando and Newhall stations and a second station platform at Santa Clarita Station. Lancaster would get a new center platform and storage tracks with this project. A new infill station at Vista Canyon in Santa Clarita began construction in 2020.

Expansion to Kern County has been discussed in a 2012 Kern County Council of Governments report. Trains would stop in Rosamond and Mojave.

See also
Lang Southern Pacific Station a California Historic Landmark

References

External links

Metrolink Schedules
 http://www.openstreetmap.org/?relation=1172222 – Route on OpenStreetMap

Line
Antelope Valley
Mojave Desert
Public transportation in Los Angeles County, California
Public transportation in the San Fernando Valley
Railway lines opened in 1992
Transportation in Palmdale, California
Transportation in Lancaster, California
1992 establishments in California